Charlotte Daneau de Muy (November 23, 1694 – September 14, 1759) was a Canadian ursuline and annalist. She was the daughter of Nicolas Daneau de Muy and Marguerite Boucher.

References

Sources

1694 births
1759 deaths
People of New France
18th-century Canadian nuns
Historians from Quebec
Canadian women historians
18th-century Canadian non-fiction writers
18th-century Canadian women writers
Canadian women non-fiction writers